Preserje is the name of several settlements in Slovenia:

 Preserje, the Municipality of Braslovče
 Preserje, the Municipality of Brezovica
 Preserje, the Municipality of Nova Gorica
 Preserje pri Komnu, the Municipality of Komen
 Preserje pri Lukovici, the Municipality of Lukovica
 Preserje pri Radomljah, the Municipality of Domžale
 Preserje pri Zlatem Polju, the Municipality of Lukovica